Columpa C. Bobb (born 1971) is a Canadian photographer, actress, playwright, poet and teacher of Coastal Salish descent.  She has been performing, writing plays, and teaching for 20 years.

Career
Bobb, who is originally from Vancouver, has written over a dozen plays that have been produced across Canada and overseas including Jumping Mouse (co-written with Marion deVries), a play for young audiences, that was nominated for a Dora Mavor Moore Award and a James Buller Award. Bobb is most recognized for the role of Mary Cook on the CBC Television show North of 60, and also appeared in the short lived series The Rez and the film Johnny Greyeyes. In 1997 she won a Jessie Richardson Theatre Award for Outstanding Performance by an Actress in a Supporting Role for her work in Firehall Theatre's production of Drew Hayden Taylor's Only Drunks and Children Tell the Truth.

She was a cultural instructor and faculty member of the Centre for Indigenous Theatre in Toronto. She is currently the Program Director and instructor, teaching classes for the Aboriginal Arts Training & Mentorship Program at the Manitoba Theatre for Young People in Winnipeg, Manitoba where she resides. The program serves about 325 students per year and is free of charge to all participants. Bobb is also an instructor for the Circus and Magic Partnership (CAMP) program through the Winnipeg International Children's Festival.

In 2019, Bobb appeared as Mavis in the National Arts Centre's production of Marie Clements' The Unnatural and Accidental Women.

Her newest poetry book, Hope Matters, was written in conjunction with her mother Lee Maracle and her sister Tania Carter, and is slated for publication in 2019.

Personal life 
Bobb is the daughter of poet and writer Lee Maracle and the great-granddaughter of actor Chief Dan George.

References

External links

1971 births
Canadian stage actresses
Canadian television actresses
Canadian women dramatists and playwrights
First Nations dramatists and playwrights
First Nations actresses
Living people
Writers from Vancouver
Actresses from Vancouver
First Nations women writers
Canadian indigenous women academics
First Nations academics
20th-century Canadian dramatists and playwrights
21st-century Canadian dramatists and playwrights
20th-century Canadian women writers
21st-century Canadian women writers
20th-century First Nations writers
21st-century First Nations writers